Marie-Hélène is a given name. Notable people with the name include:

Marie-Hélène Amiable (born 1960), French politician, Mayor of Bagneux
Marie-Hélène Arnaud (1934–1986), French model and actress
Marie-Hélène Aubert (born 1955), French politician, Member of the European Parliament for the West of France
Marie-Hélène Beaulieu (born 1979), Canadian glass artist
Marie-Hélène Mathey Boo Lowumba (born 1943), ambassador of the Democratic Republic of Congo to the United States
Marie-Hélène Chisholm (born 1979), Canadian judoka
Marie-Hélène Cousineau, Canadian film director and producer
Marie-Hélène Crombé-Berton (born 1960), Belgian politician, member of the Belgian Senate
Marie-Hélène Descamps (1938–2020), French politician, Member of the European Parliament for Central France
Marie-Hélène Dozo, Belgian film editor with more than forty film credits
Marie-Hélène des Esgaulx (born 1950), French politician, member of the Senate of France
Marie-Hélène Estienne, French playwright and screenwriter
Marie-Hélène Falcon (born 1942), former artistic director for theatre and dance in Quebec
Élisabeth Philippine Marie Hélène de France (1764–1794), French princess
Marie-Hélène Gaudreau (born 1976), Canadian politician, elected to the House of Commons
Ginette Marie Hélène Jullian (1917–1962), codenamed Adele, French WWII agent of the United Kingdom's clandestine Special Operations Executive
Marie-Hélène Lafon (born 1962), French educator and writer
Marie-Hélène Lefaucheux (1904–1964), French women's and human rights activist
Marie-Hélène Lentini, French actress and comedian
Marie-Hélène Mathieu (born 1929), French disability rights activist
Marie-Hélène Peugeot-Roncoroni (born 1961), French heiress and businesswoman
Marie-Hélène Pierre (born 1978), Mauritian badminton player
Marie-Hélène Poitras (born 1975), Canadian writer living in Montreal, Quebec
Marie-Hélène Prémont (born 1977), Canadian cross-country mountain biker
Marie-Hélène de Rothschild (1927–1996), French socialite, member of the Rothschild banking family of France
Marie-Hélène Sachet (1922–1986), French botanist
Marie-Hélène Sajka (born 1997), French handball player
Marie-Hélène Schiffers, Belgian racing cyclist
Marie-Hélène Schwartz (1913–2013), French mathematician, worked on characteristic numbers of spaces with singularities
Marie-Hélène Syre (born 1958), French equestrian
Marie-Hélène Thoraval (born 1966), French politician, Mayor of Romans-sur-Isère, member of the Regional council of Auvergne-Rhône-Alpes
Marie-Hélène Turcotte (born 1971), Canadian animation film director and artist
Marie-Hélène Verlhac, French cellular biologist specialising in the final stages of oocyte development

See also
Maria Helena
Marie (given name)
Helene (name)